Ubuntu User is a paper magazine that was launched by Linux New Media AG in May 2009.

The publication is aimed at users of the Ubuntu operating system and focuses on reviews, community news, how to articles and troubleshooting tips. It also includes a Discovery Guide aimed at beginners.

Background
Ubuntu User is published quarterly. The paper magazine is supported by a website that includes a selection of articles from the magazine available to the public as PDFs, Ubuntu news and free computer wallpaper downloads.

Issue number one consisted of 100 pages (including covers) and in its North American edition had a cover price of US$15.99 and Cdn$17.99. Each issue also includes an Ubuntu live CD in the form of a DVD that new users can use to try out Ubuntu or to install it.

Linux New Media is headquartered in Munich, Germany and has offices of its US subsidiary, Linux New Media USA, LLC, in Lawrence, Kansas. The company also publishes Linux Magazine, LinuxUser, EasyLinux in German, and Linux Community.

Reception
In announcing the launch of the magazine, the company said:

DistroWatch questioned the wisdom of launching a new paper magazine at this point in history:

See also
Full Circle Magazine

References

External links

Computer magazines published in Germany
Linux magazines
Magazines established in 2009
Magazines published in Munich
Ubuntu
2009 establishments in Germany
Quarterly magazines published in Germany